A total solar eclipse occurred on January 14, 1926. A solar eclipse occurs when the Moon passes between Earth and the Sun, thereby totally or partly obscuring the image of the Sun for a viewer on Earth. A total solar eclipse occurs when the Moon's apparent diameter is larger than the Sun's, blocking all direct sunlight, turning day into darkness. Totality occurs in a narrow path across Earth's surface, with the partial solar eclipse visible over a surrounding region thousands of kilometres wide. Totality was visible from French Equatorial Africa (the part now belonging to Central African Republic), northeastern Belgian Congo (today's DR Congo), southwestern tip of Anglo-Egyptian Sudan (the part now belonging to South Sudan), British Uganda (today's Uganda), British Kenya (today's Kenya), southern tip of Italian Somaliland (today's Somalia), British Seychelles (today's Seychelles), Dutch East Indies (today's Indonesia), North Borneo (now belonging to Malaysia), and Philippines.

Related eclipses

Solar eclipses 1924–1928

Saros 130

Inex series

Tritos series

Notes

References 

 Photo of Solar Corona January 14, 1926
 Personal Experiences at Eclipse Expeditions, By S. A. Mitchell, Director of the Leander McCormick Observatory, University of Virginia

1926 01 14
1926 01 14
1926 in science
January 1926 events